Marina Pantić (born 26 October 1988) is a Serbian handball player who plays for Le Havre and the Serbia national team.

References 

Living people
1988 births
Serbian female handball players
Sportspeople from Šabac
Expatriate handball players
Serbian expatriate sportspeople in France